"An eye for an eye" is a commandment found in the Book of Exodus 21:23–27 expressing the principle of reciprocal justice measure for measure. The earliest known use of the principle appears in the Code of Hammurabi, which predates the Hebrew Bible.

In Roman civilization, the law of retaliation bears the same principle that a person who has injured another person is to be penalized to a similar degree by the injured party.  In softer interpretations, it means the victim receives the [estimated] value of the injury in compensation. The intent behind the principle was to restrict compensation to the value of the loss.

Definition and methods
The term lex talionis does not always and only refer to literal eye-for-an-eye codes of justice (see rather mirror punishment) but applies to the broader class of legal systems that specifically formulate penalties for specific crimes, which are thought to be fitting in their severity. Some propose that this was at least in part intended to prevent excessive punishment at the hands of either an avenging private party or the state. The most common expression of lex talionis is "an eye for an eye", but other interpretations have been given as well. Legal codes following the principle of lex talionis have one thing in common: prescribed 'fitting' counter punishment for a felony. The simplest example is the "eye for an eye" principle.  In that case, the rule was that punishment must be exactly equal to the crime.

In Babylonian law
In the famous legal code written by Hammurabi, the principle of exact reciprocity is very clearly used. For example, if a person caused the death of another person, the killer would be put to death.

Various ideas regarding the origins of this law exist, but a common one is that it developed as early civilizations grew and a less well-established system for retribution of wrongs, feuds and vendettas, threatened the social fabric. Despite having been replaced with newer modes of legal theory, lex talionis systems served a critical purpose in the development of social systems—the establishment of a body whose purpose was to enact the retaliation and ensure that this was the only punishment. This body was the state in one of its earliest forms.  The earliest known use of the principle appears in the Code of Hammurabi, which predates the Hebrew Bible.

The principle is found in Babylonian Law. If it is surmised that in societies not bound by the rule of law, if a person was hurt, then the injured person (or their relative) would take vengeful retribution on the person who caused the injury. The retribution might be worse than the crime, perhaps even death. Babylonian law put a limit on such actions, restricting the retribution to be no worse than the crime, as long as victim and offender occupied the same status in society.  As with blasphemy or lèse-majesté (crimes against a god or a monarch), crimes against one's social betters were punished more severely.

In Ancient Greek law
Anaximander, teacher of Pythagoras: "The grand periodicities of nature are conceived of enacting cycles of retaliatory retribution." Socrates rejected this law.

In Hebrew law
In the Hebrew Law, the "eye for eye" was to restrict compensation to the value of the loss. Thus, it might be better read 'only one eye for one eye'.  The idiomatic biblical phrase "an eye for an eye" in Exodus and Leviticus (ayin tachat ayin) literally means 'an eye under/(in place of) an eye' while a slightly different phrase (עַיִן בְּעַיִן שֵׁן בְּשֵׁן, literally  "eye for an eye; tooth for a tooth") is used in another passage (Deuteronomy) in the context of possible reciprocal court sentences for failed false witnesses. The passage in Leviticus states, "And a man who injures his countrymanas he has done, so it shall be done to him [namely,] fracture under/for fracture, eye under/for eye, tooth under/for tooth. Just as another person has received injury from him, so it will be given to him." (Lev. 24:19–21). For an example of  being used in its regular sense of under, see Lev. 22:27 "A bull, sheep or goat, when it is born shall remain under its mother, and from the eighth day..."

The Bible allows for kofer (a monetary payment) to take the place of a bodily punishment for any crime except murder. It is not specified whether the victim, accused, or judge had the authority to choose kofer in place of bodily punishment.

Exodus 21:22-24 states: If men strive, and hurt a woman with child, so that her fruit depart from her, and yet no mischief follow: he shall be surely punished, according as the woman's husband will lay upon him; and he shall pay as the judges determine. And if any mischief follow, then thou shalt give life for life, eye for eye, tooth for tooth, hand for hand, foot for foot.

Judaism
Isaac Kalimi said that the lex talionis was "humanized" by the Rabbis who interpreted "an eye for an eye" to mean reasonable pecuniary compensation. As in the case of the Babylonian 'lex talionis', ethical Judaism and humane Jewish jurisprudence replaces the peshat (literal meaning) of the written Torah. Pasachoff and Littman point to the reinterpretation of the lex talionis as an example of the ability of Pharisaic Judaism to "adapt to changing social and intellectual ideas."

Talmud
The Talmud interprets the verses referring to "an eye for an eye" and similar expressions as mandating monetary compensation in tort cases and argues against the interpretations by Sadducees that the Bible verses refer to physical retaliation in kind, using the argument that such an interpretation would be inapplicable to blind or eyeless offenders. Since the Torah requires that penalties be universally applicable, the phrase cannot be interpreted in this manner.

However, the Torah also discusses a form of direct reciprocal justice, where the phrase ayin tachat ayin makes another appearance. Here, the Torah discusses false witnesses who conspire to testify against another person. The Torah requires the court to "do to him as he had conspired to do to his brother". Assuming the fulfillment of certain technical criteria (such as the sentencing of the accused whose punishment was not yet executed), wherever it is possible to punish the conspirators with exactly the same punishment through which they had planned to harm their fellow, the court carries out this direct reciprocal justice (including when the punishment constitutes the death penalty). Otherwise, the offenders receive lashes.

Since there is no form of punishment in the Torah that calls for the maiming of an offender (punitary amputation) there is no case where a conspiratorial false witness could possibly be punished by the court injuring to his eye, tooth, hand, or foot.  There is one case where the Torah states "…and you shall cut off her hand…" The sages of the Talmud understood the literal meaning of this verse as referring to a case where the woman is attacking a man in potentially letShal manner.  This verse teaches that, although one must intervene to save the victim, one may not kill a lethal attacker if it is possible to neutralize that attacker through non-lethal injury. Regardless, there is no verse that even appears to mandate injury to the eye, tooth, or foot.

Numbers 35:9–30 discusses the only form of remotely reciprocal justice not carried out directly by the court, where, under very limited circumstances, someone found guilty of negligent manslaughter may be killed by a relative of the deceased who takes on the role of "redeemer of blood". In such cases, the court requires the guilty party to flee to a designated city of refuge. While the guilty party is there, the "redeemer of blood" may not kill him.  If, however, the guilty party illegally forgoes his exile, the "redeemer of blood", as an accessory of the court, may kill the guilty party.

According to traditional Jewish Law, application of these laws requires the presence and maintenance of the biblically designated cities of refuge, as well as a conviction in an eligible court of 23 judges as delineated by the Torah and Talmud.  The latter condition is also applicable for any capital punishment. These circumstances have not existed for approximately 2,000 years.

Objective of reciprocal justice in Judaism
The Talmud discusses the concept of justice as measure-for-measure retribution (middah k'neged middah) in the context of divinely implemented justice. Regarding reciprocal justice by court, however, the Torah states that punishments serve to remove dangerous elements from society ("…and you shall eliminate the evil from your midst") and to deter potential criminals from violating the law ("And the rest shall hear and be daunted, and they shall no longer commit anything like this evil deed in your midst"). Additionally, reciprocal justice in tort cases serves to compensate the victim (see above).

The ideal of vengeance for the sake of assuaging the distress of the victim plays no role in the Torah's conception of court justice, as victims are cautioned against even hating or bearing a grudge against those who have harmed them. The Torah makes no distinction between whether or not the potential object of hatred or a grudge has been brought to justice, and all people are taught to love their fellow Israelites.

Social hierarchy and reciprocal justice
In Exodus 21, as in the Code of Hammurabi, the concept of reciprocal justice seemingly applies to social equals; the statement of reciprocal justice "life for life, eye for eye, tooth for tooth, hand for hand, foot for foot, burn for burn, wound for wound, stripe for stripe" is followed by an example of a different law: if a slave-owner blinds the eye or knocks out the tooth of a slave, the slave is freed but the owner pays no other consequence. On the other hand, the slave would probably be put to death for the injury of the eye of the slave-owner.

However the reciprocal justice applies across social boundaries: the "eye for eye" principle is directly followed by the proclamation "You are to have one law for the alien and the citizen." This shows a much more meaningful principle for social justice, in that the marginalized in society were given the same rights under the social structure. In this context, the reciprocal justice in an ideal functioning setting, according to Michael Coogan, "to prevent people from taking the law into their own hands and exacting disproportionate vengeance for offenses committed against them."

In Roman law
Classical texts advocating the retributive view include Cicero's De Legibus, written in the 1st century BC.

Roman law moved toward monetary compensation as a substitute for vengeance.  In cases of assault, fixed penalties were set for various injuries, although talio was still permitted if one person broke another's limb.

In Islamic law

The Quran (Q5:45) mentions the "eye for an eye" concept as being ordained for the Children of Israel. The principle of Lex talionis in Islam is Qiṣāṣ (Arabic: قصاص) as mentioned in : "O you who have believed, prescribed for you is legal retribution (Qisas) for those murdered – the free for the free, the slave for the slave, and the female for the female.  But whoever overlooks from his brother anything, then there should be a suitable follow-up and payment to him with good conduct. This is an alleviation from your Lord and a mercy.  But whoever transgresses after that will have a painful punishment." Muslim countries that use Islamic Sharia law, such as Iran or Saudi Arabia, apply the "eye for an eye" rule literally.

In 2017, an Iranian woman wounded in an acid attack was given the opportunity to have her attacker blinded with acid per sharia law.

Applications
 The death penalty is applied to murderers in some jurisdictions.
 The paramilitary group Nakam sought to kill six million Germans as revenge for the six million Jews killed during the Holocaust.

Notable criticism
Coretta Scott King used this phrase in the context of racial violence: "The old law of an eye for an eye leaves everyone blind."

Notes

See also
 Live by the sword, die by the sword

References

Bibliography
 .
 .

Book of Exodus
Biblical phrases
Christian terminology
Codes of conduct
Criminal law
English-language idioms
Human eyes in culture
Islamic terminology
Law and morality
Legal history
Revenge
Proverbs
English proverbs